"Human Nature" is a song performed by American singer Michael Jackson, and the fifth single from his sixth solo album, Thriller. The track was produced by Quincy Jones and performed by members of Toto with Michael Jackson providing vocals.

It was originally written by keyboardist Steve Porcaro, based on a conversation he had with his young daughter Heather after a boy pushed her at school, Porcaro said "he probably likes you and it's human nature". Porcaro, along with some of his bandmates from the band Toto, had been assisting with the production of Thriller, but he had not intended for "Human Nature" to be used by Jackson. However, Thriller producer Quincy Jones inadvertently heard a demo version of the track and thought it would be a great fit for the album. Jones then brought in songwriter John Bettis to rewrite the verses, whose lyrics are about a passerby in New York City.

"Human Nature" was released as a single on July 3, 1983. Like the four Thriller singles before it, the song became a top 10 hit in the US, reaching number seven on the Billboard Hot 100. It also reached number two on the Billboard Adult Contemporary chart and is certified Platinum by the Recording Industry Association of America (RIAA). In Canada and the Netherlands, the single reached number 11. The single was not released in the UK. The song garnered positive reviews from music critics. "Human Nature" has been sampled by numerous artists, including Nas with "It Ain't Hard to Tell" , and Teddy Riley who remixed SWV's single "Right Here", with a sample of "Human Nature", with the remix reaching number two on the Billboard Hot 100.

Production

The first version of "Human Nature" was written and composed by Steve Porcaro of Toto. He wrote the song when his first-grade daughter came home crying after a boy pushed her off the slide. He blurted out three reasons for the incident to comfort her: the boy liked her, people can be strange, and it's "human nature". He recorded a rough demo of the song in their studio while the Toto song "Africa" was being mixed. Fellow Toto keyboardist David Paich added some synthesizer strings on top of the demo. Originally, the song was offered to Toto but they passed on it as they preferred stadium rock-oriented material.

Paich had prepared some demo tracks for producer Quincy Jones to listen to as possible songs for Thriller and asked Porcaro to make Jones a tape with the songs. Running low on cassette tapes, Porcaro used the tape on which he had already recorded his "Human Nature" demo, putting Paich's songs on the reverse side and marking that on the label as the side that Jones should listen to. Jones listened to Paich's songs but did not think they were right for Thriller. However, he did not stop the tape when the songs finished playing, and the cassette deck playing the tape had "auto-reverse" capability, meaning that it started playing the other side as soon as the first side was finished. As Jones described it, "All of a sudden, at the end, there was all this silence, there was: 'why, why, dah dah da-dum dah dah, why, why'. Just a dummy lyric and a very skeletal thing—I get goosebumps talking about it. I said, 'This is where we wanna go, because it's got such a wonderful flavor'". However, Jones was dissatisfied with the original lyrics for the verses and asked John Bettis, who had written lyrics for hits by the Carpenters and the Pointer Sisters, among others, to write new lyrics for the song. He completed the song in two days. Jones asked if the song could be included on Jackson's album, to which Porcaro and Bettis agreed. Porcaro discusses Bettis' input in "Human Nature":

The song, as it turns out, did not change much musically from the demo through to the final album, as Jones liked the song as it was. It was, for the most part, recreated in the studio. Even engineer Bruce Swedien asked Porcaro, who played most of the parts and helped Jackson with the vocal phrasing, to help reproduce the phrasing of the accents of the "Why, why" that can be heard on the demo.

Release and reception
{{quote box
| width = 29%
| align = left
| quote = A template for new jack swing and hip-hop soul ballads, "Human Nature" is comparatively slower and more intimate than Thrillers other songs. "If this town is just an apple, let me take a bite", quivers Jackson's voice over a cascading synthesizer and percolating bass line. Though written by John Bettis and Steve Porcaro of Toto, the lyrics resonate with Jackson's yearning to break free from his tower of celebrity and mingle with young people in a "city that winks its sleepless eye".
| source = —Serena Kim, South Coast Today.
}}
"Human Nature" was released on July 3, 1983, as the fifth single from Thriller. It was not released in the UK for unknown reasons. The song achieved chart success in the US. Reaching number two on Billboard's Hot Adult Contemporary chart and number seven on the Hot 100, the song became Jackson's fifth Top 10 hit from Thriller. "Human Nature" charted at number 27 on the R&B singles chart. In the Netherlands the single reached number 11.

John Rockwell, of The New York Times, stated that "Human Nature" was a "haunting, brooding ballad" with an "irresistible" chorus. Allmusic noted that the "gentle and lovely" "Human Nature" coexisted comfortably with the "tough, scared" "Beat It". They later added that the song was a "soft rocker". Reflecting on Thriller, Slant expressed their fondness of the song, stating that it was "probably the best musical composition on the album and surely one of the only A/C ballads of its era worth remembering". The magazine added that the track's "buttery harmonies" were powerful. Stylus also praised the song, describing it as "the smoothest of ballads". However, they further added that the music "does little to embody the song's message" and that it couches Jackson's "glazed voice" in "bubble synths and drum pillows".

About.com's Bill Lamb looked back on the track 25 years after its release. He felt that the song "set down a blueprint for what would become known as adult R&B". Kelefa Sanneh of Blender described the "soft-serve balladry" of the song as a "silk-sheets masterstroke". In a 2008 IGN review, Todd Gilchrist explained that the elements of "Human Nature" worked better today than they did before. He added that it may be because modern R&B "sucks". Tom Ewing, reviewer for Pitchfork Media, described the song as "meltingly tender", with MTV adding that it was an "airy ballad". Rolling Stone claimed that the "most beautifully fragile" "Human Nature" was so open and brave it made "She's Out of My Life" seem phony. The Los Angeles Times concluded that it was Jackson's delivery that made the "middling ballad" take off.

Live performances
The song was first performed during the Jacksons' Victory Tour. Michael started to sing "Ben", but stopped and proceeded to sing "Human Nature". It was also performed during Michael's Bad World Tour and Dangerous World Tour. Jackson also performed the song live during his 1996 Royal Brunei concert. It was going to be performed for Jackson's This Is It concerts, which were canceled due to his death; however, it was included on the posthumous album to coincide with the concerts. Live versions of the song are available on the DVDs Live at Wembley July 16, 1988 and Live in Bucharest: The Dangerous Tour. Toto has performed the song in some of their shows with vocals by Joseph Williams. A live version is available on the 2019 DVD 40 Trips Around the Sun.

Charts

Weekly charts

Year-end charts

Certifications

Track listing
 7-inch vinyl
 "Human Nature" (single version) – 3:47 (Misprinted as 4:05)
 "Baby Be Mine" – 4:20

Official remixes
 Album version – 4:06
 Single version – 3:47
 Live – 4:29 (This version is taken from Live at Wembley July 16, 1988 and included in the deluxe edition of Bad 25.)
 "Speechless"/"Human Nature" – 3:18 (Immortal version)

Samplings
Songs that have sampled "Human Nature" include:
 "Right Here (Human Nature Remix)" by SWV, a 1993 Teddy Riley-produced remix of the 1992 SWV song "Right Here". It spent seven weeks at number one on the Billboard Hot R&B Singles chart. The music video for the remix included clips of Jackson performing on the Dangerous World Tour, including a hologram of the pop singer intercut with wildlife footage from Free Willy in which the song was featured in.
 "It Ain't Hard to Tell" (1994) by Nas. Nas has performed "It Ain't Hard to Tell" as a mashup with "Human Nature" using Jackson's original vocals at some concerts.
 "I'm in Heaven" (2003) by Jason Nevins featuring Holly James, used an interpolation of the hook from "Human Nature".
 "She Ain't You" by Chris Brown from his album F.A.M.E. (2011).
 "Don Life" by Big Sean (feat. Lil Wayne) from his album Detroit 2 (2020).

Personnel
 Written and composed by Steve Porcaro and John Bettis
 Produced by Quincy Jones
 Michael Jackson: vocals
 David Paich: synthesizer
 Steve Porcaro: synthesizer, synthesizer programming
 Steve Lukather: guitar
 Jeff Porcaro: drums
 Paulinho Da Costa: percussion
 Michael Boddicker: E-mu Emulator
 Arrangement by David Paich, Steve Porcaro and Steve Lukather

Other versions
"Human Nature" was covered by Miles Davis on his 1985 album You're Under Arrest; at the time Davis also suggested that the song could become a jazz standard.

Toto has occasionally performed the song as part of a tribute to Jackson and to celebrate the 40th anniversary of the band.

References

Sources
 George, Nelson (2004). Michael Jackson: The Ultimate Collection'' booklet. Sony BMG.
 
 

Michael Jackson songs
1982 songs
1983 singles
Contemporary R&B ballads
Rock ballads
Songs with lyrics by John Bettis
Song recordings produced by Quincy Jones
Epic Records singles
Songs about New York City
1980s ballads
Songs written by Steve Porcaro
American soft rock songs